Santa Lúcia is a municipality in the state of São Paulo in Brazil. The population is 8,854 (2020 est.) in an area of 154 km². The elevation is 705 m.

References

Municipalities in São Paulo (state)